Aulaukik Istimaar is a collection of Bengali poetry by Bangladeshi author Humayun Azad. It was the first book of Azad which was published in 1973 from Khan Brothers and Co. A reprint was published from Agamee Prakashani later. The poems in the book are able to foreshadow the mainstream and style of broad thought in Azad's later life poetry.

Theme
The book consists of poems written by Humayun Azad when he was a Dhaka University student from 1964 to 1968 and also when he entered in his job life in late 1960s decade; some poems were written in the early part of the 1970s decade, included in this book. The poems of this book are mixed with Azad's personal emotions. The name of the book also comes from Azad's one of nostalgic childhood memories. Poems based on unrequited love are an important part of this book.

Publication
Aulaukik Istimaar was published in 1973, it was the year when Azad went in Scotland for doing PhD in linguistics from University of Edinburgh. The book was published by Khan Brothers and Co. (a printing press from Dhaka) but later it was being published from Agamee Prakashani.

In 1973 when the book was first published Azad was described as 'Bangladeshi young urban poet' by readers community.

List of poems
There are 49 poems in this book.

 স্নানের জন্য (For Bathing)
 আত্মজৈবনিক, একুশ বছর বয়সে (Self story, at the age of 21)
 জননী (Progenitress)
 আমার সন্তান (My child)
 আমার কন্যার জন্য প্রার্থণা (Praying for my daughter)
 বৃষ্টি নামে (Rain falls)
 আর্টগ্যালারির সুন্দরীদের জন্য (For beautiful young women of art-gallery)
 নতুন সঙ্গিনীকে (Dedicated to the new partner)
 বঙ্গ উন্নয়ন ট্রাস্ট (Bengal development trust)
 অম্লান জল (Fresh water)
 ব্লাড ব্যাংক (Blood bank)
 টয়লেট (Toilet)
 রোদনের স্মৃতি (Memories of crying)
 বিরোধী দল (Anti-party)
 জ্যোৎস্নার অত্যাচার (Outrage of the moon)
 প্রেম-ভালোবাসা (Love-romance)
 আজ রাতে (Tonight)
 তোমার ক্ষমতা (Your power)
 বেহালা (Violin)
 হাত (Palm of hand)
 স্বপ্নলোকে লুটতরাজ (Looting in dreamland)
 জীবনচরিতাংশ (A slice of life)
 বাঘিনী (Tigress)
 রাত্রি (Night)
 অলৌকিক ইস্টিমার (Unearthly steamer)
 ছাদআরোহীর কাসিদা (The roof-top jumper)
 স্টেজ (Stage)
 শ্রেণীসংগ্রাম (Class struggle)
 আত্মহত্যার অস্ত্রাবলি (Suicidal weapons)
 যদি তুমি আসো (If you come)
 বাহু (Hand)
 তার করতাল (Her clapping)
 সব সাংবাদিক জানেন (Every journalist knows)
 অন্ধ ও বধির স্যান্ডেল (Blind and deaf sandal)
 বিবস্ত্র চাঁদ ('Unclothed' moon)
 যাচ্ছি (Going...)
 যদি মরে যাই (If I die)
 দু'দিন ধরে দেখা নেই (No meeting since two days)
 গৃহনির্মাণ (Making house)
 হরোস্কোপ (Horoscope)
 আমার ছাত্র ও তার প্রেমিকার জন্য এলিজি (My student and elegy for his lover)
 রেস্তোরাঁর পার্শ্ববর্তী টেবিলের তরুণের প্রতি (For the young man of side-table of the restaurant)
 চিত্রিত শহর (Drawn city)
 আমার গৃহ (My home)
 জনতা ও জান্টা, (Population and junta)
 এসভা প্রস্তাব করছে, (This meeting has proposed)
 খোকনের সানগ্লাস (Khokon's sunglass)
 যাও রিকশা যাও (Go rickshaw go)
 হুমায়ুন আজাদ (Humayun Azad)

References

External links
Alaukik Istimar at google books
Alaukik Istimar at WorldCat
Books by Humayun Azad
Bengali poetry
Bengali poetry collections
1973 books
Bangladeshi poetry books